Parque del Recuerdo is a group of cemetery parks located in Santiago, Chile.

Parque del Recuerdo Américo Vespucio
Opened in 1980, Parque del Recuerdo Américo Vespucio is located in the commune of Huechuraba, in the northern sector of the city of Santiago. It was the first cemetery of its kind in the country. It occupies 59 hectares and has a cinerary.

Persons interred
  (c. 1938–2009), actor and comedian
  (1938–2006), conductor
  (1945–2001), television director
 José Alejandro Bernales (1949–2008), director of the Carabineros de Chile from 2005 to 2008
  (1962–1994), founder of the band La Ley
 Eduardo Bonvallet (1955–2015), footballer, coach, and sports commentator
 Roberto Bruce (1979–2011), television journalist
 Felipe Camiroaga (1966–2011), television presenter
 Patricio Carvajal (1916–1994), vice admiral and minister of the military dictatorship
 Carlo de Gavardo, racing driver and motorcyclist
 Carolina Fadic (1974–2002), actress and television presenter
 Néstor Isella (1937–2015), footballer, coach, and sports commentator
  (1941–2017), poet, theorist, and visual artist
 Gustavo Leigh (1920–1999), general and commander-in-chief of the Chilean Air Force, part of the Government Junta
 Bernardo Leighton (1909–1995), lawyer and politician
 Sergio Livingstone (1920–2012), footballer and sports commentator
  (1921–2004), journalist and radio and television presenter
 Fernando Matthei (1925–2017), general and commander-in-chief of the Chilean Air Force, part of the Government Junta
 César Mendoza (1918–1996), Olympic medalist and general director of the Carabineros, part of the Government Junta
  (1915–2016), Spanish-Chilean writer
  (1949–1987), television journalist
 Myriam Palacios (1936–2013), actress and comedian
 Matilde Pérez (1916–2014), painter and sculptor, pioneer of kinetic art in Chile
 Fernando Riera (1920–2010), footballer and coach
 Andrés Rillón (1929–2017), lawyer, actor, director, and comedian
 Peter Rock (1945–2016), Austrian-Chilean musician
  (1952–2013), radio and television journalist
 Gabriel Valdés (1919–2011), lawyer, diplomat, academic, and politician
  (1927–2010), Argentine-Chilean historian and intellectual
 Sonia Viveros (1949–2003), actress
 Raimundo Tupper (1969–1995), footballer
 Adolfo Zaldívar (1943–2013), politician, lawyer, and professor
 Margot Honecker (1927–2016), East German politician and wife of leader Erich Honecker
 Eugenio Cruz Vargas (1923–2014), painter and poet
 Rodolfo Opazo Bernales (1935–2019),  painter and sculptor
 Joaquín Marcó Figueroa (1892-1956), former superintendent of the Casa de Moneda de Chile, and author

Parque del Recuerdo Santa Clara
Parque del Recuerdo Santa Clara, also called Américo Vespucio II,  is an extension of the previous park, located at the back by Santa Clara Avenue. It occupies approximately 25 hectares and is still in its construction phase.

Parque del Recuerdo Cordillera
Parque del Recuerdo Cordillera is located in the commune of La Florida, close to the Andean foothills. It was opened in 1998 and occupies 69 hectares.

Persons interred
  (1950–2002), singer
 Paul Schäfer, German immigrant leader

Parque del Recuerdo Padre Hurtado
Parque del Recuerdo Padre Hurtado, also known as Parque del Recuerdo Malloco, is located in the commune of Peñaflor, in the peripheral sector of Santiago. It is surrounded by a rural and natural environment. It was opened in 1998 and occupies 35 hectares.

In popular culture
The episode "El funeral de Tulio" of the children's TV series 31 Minutos was filmed in the Parque del Recuerdo Cordillera cemetery.

References

External links

 

1980 establishments in Chile
Cemeteries in Chile
Parks in Santiago, Chile